"Slow Down" is a song performed by Dutch singer Douwe Bob. The song represented the Netherlands in the Eurovision Song Contest 2016, and was written by Bob along with Jan Peter Hoekstra, Jeroen Overman, and Matthijs van Duijvenbode. The song was released as a digital download on 5 March 2016 through Universal Music Netherlands as the lead single from his album Fool Bar.

Eurovision Song Contest

Douwe Bob was announced as the Dutch entrant to the Eurovision Song Contest 2016 by Dutch media on 20 September 2015. Two days later, he confirmed the news during the Dutch talk show De Wereld Draait Door. "Slow Down" was revealed as his Eurovision entry on 4 March 2016 during a press conference in Amsterdam. The song was released as a digital download the day after. He performed in the first half of the semi-final. He got through the semi-final and performed in the grande final on Saturday 14 May 2016, coming in 11th place with 153 points.

Track listing

Charts

Release history

References

Eurovision songs of the Netherlands
Eurovision songs of 2016
2015 songs
2016 singles
Douwe Bob songs
Universal Music Group singles